Mauricio Alfredo Aubone Cabral (born February 25, 1992 in San Juan, Argentina) is an Argentine footballer currently playing for Ferro De La Pampa currently he plays in the Torneo Federal A   .

Teams
 Boca Juniors 2003–12
 Douglas Haig 2013–14
 Rangers 2014–16
 Hapoel Nazareth Illit 2016
 Ferro De La Pampa 2016–present

References
 
 

1992 births
Living people
Argentine footballers
Argentine expatriate footballers
Boca Juniors footballers
Club Atlético Douglas Haig players
Rangers de Talca footballers
Hapoel Nof HaGalil F.C. players
Primera B de Chile players
Argentine Primera División players
Liga Leumit players
Expatriate footballers in Chile
Expatriate footballers in Israel
Argentine expatriate sportspeople in Chile
Argentine expatriate sportspeople in Israel
Torneo Federal A players
People from San Juan, Argentina
Association football forwards
Sportspeople from San Juan Province, Argentina